Happy Entrance was a middling ship of the English navy, built by Andrew Burrell at Deptford and launched in 1619. King James I originally named the ship Buckingham's Entrance to mark the appointment of his favourite, George Villiers, 1st Duke of Buckingham, as Lord High Admiral of England. But she was subsequently renamed.

During the Second English Civil War she served on the side of Parliament under the command of Richard Badiley. In April 1649, a party of seamen from Happy Entrance captured and burnt the Royalist ship Antelope at  Hellevoetsluis in the Netherlands. Antelope was then over 100 years old and was a veteran of the 1588 campaign against the Spanish Armada.

Happy Entrance was destroyed by fire in 1658.

Notes

References
Citations

Bibliography

 Clowes, William Laird: The Royal Navy. A History from the Earliest Times to 1900, vols. 1-2,1896-1898
Lavery, Brian (2003) The Ship of the Line - Volume 1: The development of the battlefleet 1650-1850. Conway Maritime Press. .

Ships of the English navy
Ships built in Deptford
1610s ships